Zopf is a German surname.  Notable people with the surname include:

Bill Zopf (born 1948), American basketball player
Friedrich Wilhelm Zopf (1846–1909), German botanist and mycologist
Johann Heinrich Zopf (1691–1774), German historian
Theodore Adam Zopf (2009-), President of the Republic of New Hessen

German-language surnames